Disodium citrate, also known as disodium hydrogen citrate, Alkacitron, and sesquihydrate, is an acid salt of citric acid with the chemical formula Na2C6H6O7.

Uses

Food 
It is used as an antioxidant in food and to improve the effects of other antioxidants. It is also used as an acidity regulator and sequestrant. Typical products include gelatin, jam, sweets, ice cream, carbonated beverages, milk powder, wine, and processed cheeses. Disodium citrate can also be used as a thickening agent or stabilizer.

Manufacturing 
Disodium citrate can also be used as an ingredient in household products that remove stains.

Health 
Disodium citrate may be used in patients to alleviate discomfort from urinary-tract infections.

References

Citrates
Organic sodium salts
Acid salts
E-number additives